Ricardo Torres may refer to:

 Ricardo Torres (boxer) (born 1980), Colombian boxer
 Ricardo Torres (baseball) (1891–1960), Major League Baseball catcher and first baseman
 Ricardo Torres (cinematographer) (born 1911), on films such as Under the Sky of Spain
 Ricardo Torres (swimmer) (born 1967), Panamanian swimmer
 Ricardo Torres Balaguer (born 1955), Spanish politician
 Ricardo Torres (Sunset Beach), a fictional character in the American soap opera Sunset Beach